The Roman Catholic Diocese of Kabale is a diocese located in the city of Kabale in the Ecclesiastical province of Mbarara in Uganda.

History
 February 1, 1966: Established as Diocese of Kabale from Diocese of Mbarara

Leadership
 Bishops of Kabale (Roman rite)
 Bishop Barnabas R. Halem ’Imana (1969.05.29 – 1994.07.15)
 Bishop Robert Marie Gay, M. Afr. (1996.01.11 – 2003.03.15)
 Bishop Callistus Rubaramira (since 2003.03.15)

See also
Roman Catholicism in Uganda
Kabale

References

Sources
catholic-hierarchy

External links
 GCatholic.org
 Catholic Hierarchy

Roman Catholic dioceses in Uganda
Christian organizations established in 1966
Roman Catholic dioceses and prelatures established in the 20th century
Kabale District
Roman Catholic Ecclesiastical Province of Mbarara